Barbara Baldavin (born October 18, 1938) is an American television and movie actress.

Career
Baldavin mainly performed in dramatic roles.  In the 1960s she played a small recurring part in Star Trek as Angela Martine, most prominently featured in "Balance of Terror" and "Shore Leave".
She appeared in season three's episode Turnabout Intruder as a different character, communications officer and court reporter, Lt. Lisa.

In Season 1, Episode 22 of Adam 12,she played Betty Wells, the wife of Officer Ed Wells, played by Gary Crosby. In 1969 Baldavin played Sally Fisher, a nurse and girlfriend of Pete Malloy (Martin Milner) in episode6 “A Sound Like Thunder” from season 2 of “Adam 12.” (In the 1970s she was a regular cast member in Medical Center as Nurse Holmby. In 1971 she appeared in Mannix, Season 5 Episode14 'To Save a Dead Man' as Mrs Kilgore (imposter).

She went on to become a casting director and assistant for Trapper John, M.D. and Dynasty.  In September 2010, she was shown as a member of the faculty at Dawn Wells' Film Actor's Boot Camp.

Personal
Baldavin married Joseph D'Agosta, also a casting director and producer.

Partial filmography

Casting
Sources:
 Trapper John M.D.
 Dynasty
 Matt Houston
 Strike Force

Acting
 1964 Rawhide
 1965 The Fugitive
 1966 Felony Squad
 1967-1969 Star Trek
 1969 Adam-12
 1971 Columbo
 1971 Women in Chains
 1974 McMillan & Wife
 1975 Airport 1975
 1975 Baretta
 1976 Barnaby Jones
 1978 Quincy M.E.
 1979-1980 Vega$
 1993 Skeeter

References

External links
 

1938 births
Living people
American television actresses
21st-century American women